Murray Gerstenhaber (born June 5, 1927) is an American mathematician and professor of mathematics at the University of Pennsylvania, best known for his contributions to theoretical physics with his discovery of Gerstenhaber algebra. He is also a lawyer and a lecturer in law at the University of Pennsylvania Law School.

Early life and education
Gerstenhaber was born in Brooklyn, New York, to Pauline (née Rosenzweig; who was born in Romania; died in 1978) and Joseph Gerstenhaber (who was born in 1892 in Romania; died in 1975). His father was trained as a jeweler, "but being unable to find work in this line he [took] employment in a factory making airplane precision instruments”. As to his mother, in 2015 he noted: "For someone born into a minority family without means, I have been exceedingly lucky. The problems faced by talented but disadvantaged children today are preventing many who could be important contributors to the sciences, arts, and society in general, from achieving their potential. They don’t all have mothers like mine, who fought to find a path to education for her child. We have to seek them out but are not doing enough to find them, bring them out of isolation, and give them the opportunities I was so fortunate to have enjoyed."

He was a child prodigy who was profiled in Leta Hollingworth's book Children Above 180 IQ (1942). In this book, Gerstenhaber was dubbed "Child L," and his prodigious abilities and personality traits were described in great detail. At age 9 years 5 months, a Stanford-Binet test showed him to have a mental age of between 17 and 18 and an IQ between 195 and 198. A second revised Stanford-Binet given a year later found him to have a mental age of 19 years 11 months and an IQ of 199+.

He attended the now-defunct Speyer School, a school for rapid learners in New York City. Many years later, his daughter-in-law co-founded Speyer Legacy School, naming the new school after the original.  After graduating from Speyer School, Gerstenhaber entered the Bronx High School of Science in 1940. From 1945 to 1947 he served in the infantry in the United States Army as a corporal assigned to the Office of Military Government for Germany. 

Gerstenhaber finished his B.S. in mathematics at Yale University (1948). At Yale, he participated in the William Lowell Putnam Mathematical Competition and was on the team representing Yale University (along with Murray Gell-Mann and Henry O. Pollak) that won the second prize in 1947; each of them received a monetary prize of $30 ($ in current dollar terms). His 1948 participation in the competition earned him a Top 10 ranking.

He earned an M.A. and a Ph.D. (1951) in mathematics from the University of Chicago, under the instruction of Abraham Adrian Albert. Gerstenhaber's dissertation was entitled "Rings of Derivations."

Gerstenhaber earned a J.D. from the University of Pennsylvania Law School in 1973, and was admitted to the Pennsylvania bar in 1974.

Career
Gerstenhaber was an assistant professor in the Department of Mathematics at the University of Pennsylvania from 1953 to 1958, rising to associate professor (1958–61), and full professor (1961–present) and chairman. His research interests include: Algebraic Deformation Theory, Universal Algebra, Quantum Groups, and Statistics for Law. He is best known for his contributions to theoretical physics with his discovery of Gerstenhaber algebra.

Among his writings have been "Algebraic cohomology and deformation theory," with SD Schack, Deformation theory of algebras and structures and applications, 11–264 (1988), "On the deformation of rings and algebras," Annals of Mathematics, Second Series, Vol. 79, No. 1 (Jan., 1964), pp. 59–103, and "The cohomology structure of an associative ring," Annals of Mathematics, Second Series, Vol. 78, 267–288 (1963). For these last two papers he received in 2021 the Leroy P. Steele Prize for Seminal Contribution to Research. Gerstenhaber noted in 1990:  “The ability to hang in there has a lot to do with scientific productivity, I am convinced. And in mathematics … hanging in there is a solitary accomplishment.”

Gerstenhaber was chairman of the faculty senate at the University of Pennsylvania from 1982 to 1983.

He is also a lecturer in law at the University of Pennsylvania Law School, teaching a seminar on statistics for law.

In 2012 he became a Fellow of the American Mathematical Society, and was a member of its council. Gerstenhaber was the managing editor of the Bulletin of the American Mathematical Society. Gerstenhaber is also a Fellow of the American Association for the Advancement of Science.

In 2021 he received the Steele Prize for Seminal Contribution to Research.

Personal
Gerstenhaber married Dr. Ruth Priscilla Zager on June 3, 1956, in the Spanish and Portuguese Synagogue in New York City. They have lived in Merion Station, Pennsylvania, and Haverford, Pennsylvania, and have three children: Jeremy M. Gerstenhaber, David Ezra Gerstenhaber (now founder, president, and portfolio manager at Argonaut Management), and Rachel Rebecca Stern (now general counsel and head of strategic resources of FactSet). His son David, a hedge fund manager and Tiger Management alumnus, is married to financier Steven Posner's daughter Kelly.

See also
Nilpotent orbit
Purely inseparable extension

References

External links
 Personal homepage

American people of Romanian-Jewish descent
Jewish American scientists
Jewish physicists
Jewish American academics
Jewish American attorneys
20th-century American mathematicians
21st-century American mathematicians
Mathematical physicists
Theoretical physicists
Fellows of the American Mathematical Society
Yale University alumni
University of Chicago alumni
University of Pennsylvania Law School alumni
University of Pennsylvania Law School faculty
University of Pennsylvania faculty
Mathematicians at the University of Pennsylvania
1927 births
Living people
The Bronx High School of Science alumni
Scientists from New York City
Lawyers from New York City
Mathematicians from New York (state)
Mathematicians from Philadelphia
People from Lower Merion Township, Pennsylvania
People from Haverford Township, Pennsylvania
21st-century American Jews